A Romantic Adventuress is a 1920 American silent drama film directed by Harley Knoles and written by Charles Belmont Davis and Rosina Henley. The film stars Dorothy Dalton, Charles Meredith, Howard Lang, Augusta Anderson, and Ivo Dawson. The film was released in November 1920, by Paramount Pictures.

Plot
As described in a film magazine, Alice Vanni (Dalton), daughter of dancing master Professor Vanni (Lang) and prima donna Mrs. Martyn (Anderson), who abandoned her husband during the child's babyhood to go her selfish way, is sent after the death of her father to stay with her mother whom she has not known. With the aid of her cohort Louis Fitch (Dawson), the mother plans a wealthy marriage for the young woman in ambition of repairing her own fortunes. To further this plan the trio go abroad. In a watering place in Europe, Alice meets Captain Maxwell of the prior year's Yale football team, whom she first saw in a brilliant play during the Yale-Harvard game. She gives her heart to him, but her mother insists she accept the advances of the Italian Signor Castelli (Ardizoni). The latter is later proved to be a married man and the clever mother and Fitch blackmail him for several thousand dollars. Alice eventually defies her mother and accepts the love the Yale man offers her regardless of his lack of wealth.

Cast
Dorothy Dalton as Alice Vanni
Charles Meredith as Captain Maxwell
Howard Lang as Professor Vanni
Augusta Anderson as Mrs. Martyn
Ivo Dawson as Louis Fitch
John Ardizoni as Signor Castelli
Howard Lang as James Cortright
Evan Burroughs Fontaine as Dancer
Robert Schable as Charles Robertson

References

External links 
 

1920 films
1920s English-language films
Silent American drama films
1920 drama films
Paramount Pictures films
Films directed by Harley Knoles
American black-and-white films
American silent feature films
1920s American films